Agrilus quadriguttatus is a species of metallic wood-boring beetle in the family Buprestidae. It is found in North America.

Subspecies
These three subspecies belong to the species Agrilus quadriguttatus:
 Agrilus quadriguttatus fulminans Fisher, 1928
 Agrilus quadriguttatus niveiventris Horn, 1891
 Agrilus quadriguttatus quadriguttatus Gory, 1841

References

Further reading

 
 
 

quadriguttatus
Articles created by Qbugbot
Beetles described in 1841